The ARIA Music Award for Single of the Year/Song of the Year, is an award presented at the annual ARIA Music Awards, which recognises "the many achievements of Aussie artists across all music genres", since 1987. It is handed out by the Australian Recording Industry Association (ARIA), an organisation whose aim is "to advance the interests of the Australian record industry." 
Initially, the award was given to an Australian group or solo artist who have had a single or an extended play appear in the ARIA Top 100 Singles Chart between the eligibility period, and was voted for by a judging academy, which consists of 1000 members from different areas of the music industry. 5 Seconds of Summer has won the most awards at three ("She Looks So Perfect" in 2014, "Youngblood" in 2018, "Teeth" in 2020). Artists which have won the award twice are Silverchair ("Tomorrow" in 1995, "Straight Lines" in 2007), Kylie Minogue ("Where the Wild Roses Grow" in 1996, "Can't Get You Out of My Head" in 2002), and Powderfinger ("The Day You Come" in 1999, "My Happiness" in 2001).

From 2012, onwards the winner has instead been determined by the general public. The nominees are chosen based on the top ten highest selling Australian single releases, based on ARIA chart sales statistics, during the eligibility period. The song can be an album track which has subsequently been released as a single. The artist can only receive one nomination in this category, even if the artist has multiple songs in the ARIA top ten. The public votes are tallied by ARIA, with the winner announced at the awards ceremony.

Winners and nominees
In the following table, the winner is highlighted in a separate colour, and in boldface; the nominees are those that are not highlighted or in boldface.

Single of the Year

Song of the Year

References

External links
The ARIA Awards Official website

S